The Space Applications Centre is an Indian research institution in Ahmedabad, India.

Space Applications Centre may also refer to:

 Haryana Space Applications Centre, Hisar (HARSAC), India
 North-Eastern Space Applications Centre, Meghalaya, India
 European Centre for Space Applications and Telecommunications

See also
 Indian Space Research Organisation (ISRO)